Amata atricornis is a moth of the  family Erebidae. It was described by Wallengren in 1863. It is found in South Africa and Zimbabwe.

References

 Natural History Museum Lepidoptera generic names catalog

atricornis
Moths described in 1863
Moths of Africa